E with macron (Э̄ э̄; italics: Э̄ э̄) is a letter of the Cyrillic script.

E with macron is used in the Aleut (Bering dialect), Evenki, Mansi, Nanai, Negidal, Orok, Ulch, Kildin Sami, Selkup and Chechen languages.

References

See also
Е̄ е̄ : Cyrillic letter Ye with macron
Ē ē : Latin letter Ē
Cyrillic characters in Unicode

Cyrillic letters with diacritics
Letters with macron